Miami University Hamilton (Miami Hamilton) is a satellite campus of Miami University in Hamilton, Ohio. It was founded in 1968 and is one of three regional campuses of Miami University.

History
In 1946, Miami University began offering classes in Hamilton and Middletown to meet the needs of people living in those communities who could not attend college. The success of these classes led to the creation of five academic centers in Norwood, Dayton, Piqua and the existing Hamilton and Middletown locations. Steady growth of student enrollment combined with local support for higher education led to the opening of Miami Middletown in 1966 and Miami Hamilton in 1968. The Dayton and Piqua academic centers were replaced by Wright State University; the responsibilities for the Norwood academic center were assumed by the University of Cincinnati.

Campus
Miami Hamilton is a small, compact campus consisting of five academic buildings, a gymnasium, and a conservatory.

Buildings
The Conservatory – 2006, houses several sustained environments, contains space for lectures and demonstrations
Gym – 1980, houses fitness center and 120-foot gymnasium
Mosler Hall – 1969, named in memory of the Mosler Foundation's founders Mr. and Mrs. Edwin Mosler, Sr; houses Office of Admission, Business Office, Campus Bookstore, Computer Labs, Faculty offices, and One-stop for Student Success
Phelps Hall – 1972, named for Dr. Bernard F. Phelps, former Mayor of Oxford and first director of the Hamilton Campus; houses departments of Justice and Community studies, Integrative studies, and Engineering Technology, and a state of the art Theatre Studio.
Rentschler Hall – 1968, named in honor of the Rentschler family who supported higher public education in the Hamilton area; houses the Multi-cultural services, Learning Assistance, Student Services, Faculty Offices, Art Studios, Darkroom, and labs
Schwarm Hall – 1997, houses the Harrier's Nest dining hall on the first floor and the Rentschler Library on the second floor. The building is connected to Harry T. Wilks Conference center via a bridge that forms the entrance archway into the university
University Hall – 1972, houses Engineering Labs, Engineering, Nursing program classrooms and Theatre classrooms
Harry T. Wilks Conference Center – 1997, named for retired Hamilton attorney Harry Wilks who created endowment fund scholarships for Hamilton campus students who could not otherwise financially attend college

Academics
Miami University Hamilton is a small, primarily nonresidential teaching university with a focus on undergraduate studies. The College of Liberal Arts and Applied Science is an academic division of Miami University housed entirely at Miami University Hamilton and consists of twelve academic departments. The university offers 31 majors and 8 minors.

Student Life

Student Body

In 2020, Miami Hamilton had a total enrollment of 2,451 admitted students. Of these, 48% were male and 51% were female.

Student-Run Organizations

Miami Hamilton has over 53 registered student organizations. These clubs and organizations vary from Arts & Humanities, to political and religious groups, geology, theatre and LGBTQ+ organizations. The university recognizes the Student Government Association (SGA) who represent the students of Miami Hamilton. The SGA members work closely with administrators, faculty and staff, providing input that influences many administrative decisions directly affecting students. Members act as liaisons between students and faculty and serve as voting members on the University Senate on the Oxford campus and the Hamilton Campus Senate.

Athletics
Miami University Hamilton is home of the Miami Hamilton Harriers. The Harriers field competitive teams in men's baseball, basketball, golf and tennis; women's teams include basketball, cheerleading, softball, tennis and volleyball. Miami Hamilton participates in the Ohio Regional Campus Conference with other regional campuses of Ohio universities including the Miami University Middletown Thunderhawks. The university is a member of the United States Collegiate Athletic Association and can complete for National Championships.

The Harrier Baseball Program has been the campus's most successful athletic program, claiming the ORCC Regular Season and Tournament Championship in 11 of the last 12 seasons.

Team Name
Miami Hamilton's athletic teams were originally known as the Chiefs. In 1997, the Miami people withdrew their support for the Miami University "Redskins" nickname, prompting the university to rename to Miami RedHawks. At the same time, Miami Hamilton changed their name to the Harriers and Miami Middletown changed their name to the Thunderhawks.

Miami University System
 Miami University, Oxford, Ohio (main campus)
 Miami University Hamilton, Hamilton, Ohio
 Miami University Middletown, Middletown, Ohio
 Miami University Dolibois European Center, Luxembourg
 Miami University Voice of America Learning Center- West Chester, Ohio

References

External links

Athletics website

Miami University
Public universities and colleges in Ohio
Education in Butler County, Ohio
Buildings and structures in Butler County, Ohio
Hamilton, Ohio
Buildings and structures in Hamilton, Ohio
Educational institutions established in 1968
Tourist attractions in Butler County, Ohio
1968 establishments in Ohio